Willie Neal Johnson (August 25, 1935 – January 10, 2001) was an American gospel singer, who became known as "Country Boy" for his rootsy blues-driven style and his down to earth, friendly personality.

Willie was born in Tyler, Texas, United States; he was the oldest of six children in a musical family. His mother motivated her children to pursue their singing careers by taking them to church and making them sing on Sundays. While in his teens he was tapped to join Rev. C. W. Jackson's group the Five Ways of Joy Gospel Singers.

A few years later he formed Willie Neal Johnson and the Gospel Keynotes with long-time friends, Ralph McGee, Rev. J. D. Talley, Charles Bailey, John Jackson, Lonzo Jackson, and Archie B. McGee in 1964. After rising to popularity across the Southwest the group signed to Nashboro Records where they scored a major hit with "Show Me the Way". They received a Grammy Award nomination in 1980 for Ain't No Stoppin' Us Now". The Gospel Keynotes went on to record over 20 LPs for Nashboro.

Line-up changes were common and among the more notable talents which passed through the roster in the following years were: Paul Beasley, Larry McCowin, Donny Timmons, Alfred "Gino" Smith, Ermant Franklin Jr., Robert Williams, Jeffrey Newberry, Val Alexander, Rev. Charles McLean, Lonnie Hill and Teddy Cross. After Nashboro closed its doors they signed to the Malaco Records located in Jackson, Mississippi. In 1985 they changed their name to Willie Neal Johnson and the New Keynotes with Lamanuel Boykin (keyboards), Maurice Morgan (guitar) and the Talley Brothers, Kenneth (KT) (guitar), Sheldon (bass guitar), and David (drums). With Malaco they recorded seven albums. They were inducted into the Gospel Music Hall of Fame in Detroit and the American Gospel Quartet Hall of Fame in Birmingham, Alabama in 1999.

His last recording was an appearance on Kirk Franklin's The Rebirth of Kirk Franklin'' in 2000, on the song "Lookin' Out For Me." Willie died of a stroke on January 10, 2001 at the age of 65 in Tyler, Texas. He was survived by his wife, Captoria, three sons, five daughters, and by his mother, Luretia.

References 

1935 births
2001 deaths
People from Tyler, Texas
American gospel singers
Singers from Texas
20th-century American singers
Malaco Records artists